Flookburgh is an ancient village on the Cartmel peninsula in Cumbria, England, until 1974 part of Lancashire. Being close to Morecambe Bay, cockle and shrimp fishing plays a big part in village life.

Flookburgh is sometimes thought to derive its name from a flat fish, known as the Fluke, found in the area. (Many people in Flookburgh say, in fact, that Flookburgh wasn't named after the Fluke; the Fluke was named after the village.) However, it is far more likely that the name is Norse, an adaptation of 'Flugga's Town'.

Location

Governance
Flookburgh  is part of the Westmorland and Lonsdale parliamentary constituency, of which Tim Farron is the current MP representing the Liberal Democrats.

For local government purposes, it is in the Cartmel ward of South Lakeland District Council, the Cartmel division of Cumbria County Council and Lower Holker civil parish.

See also

Listed buildings in Lower Holker

References

External links

 Cumbria County History Trust: Holker, Lower (nb: provisional research only – see Talk page)
  Cross Bay Challenge from Flookburgh to Hest Bank by ITV's Keith Wilkinson (reporter)
 ITV Local report on Cross Bay Challenge from Flookburgh 2008
 The Cumbria Directory page on Flookburgh

Flookburgh
Flookburgh
Morecambe Bay